= J.F.K. Assassination: A Visual Investigation =

Educational interactive CD-ROM on the assassination of John F. Kennedy

J.F.K Assassination: A Visual Investigation
- Publisher: Kozel Multimedia

J.F.K. Assassination: A Visual Investigation is an educational interactive CD-ROM.

== Development ==
J.F.K. Assassination: A Visual Investigation is an educational interactive CD-ROM conceived by Raphael Laderman and developed by his company Kozel Multimedia.

== Reception ==
The game was nominated for two awards at the Digital Hollywood Awards for Best Reference CD - Journalism or General interest, and Best CD-ROM.

The editors of Electronic Entertainment presented J.F.K Assassination with their 1993 "Best Multimedia Title" award, and wrote that it "brilliantly employs multimedia technology to let you conduct your own investigation".

== Legacy ==
It was followed by a CD-ROM entitled Serial Killer (aka Mind of a Killer), which examined famous cases of serial killers.
